The Bandingilo National Park, sometimes spelled Badingilo, is located in South Sudan's Equatoria region. The park covered the erstwhile states of Central Equatoria and Eastern Equatoria. It was established in 1992.

Earth's second-largest annual animal migration (largest is the Serengeti migration), involving multiple species of antelope including reedbuck, tiang, and white-eared kob, takes place in the park, which is also home to iconic African megafauna like the Nubian giraffe. It also contains large marshlands stretching up into Jonglei state. Predators like the African wild dogs, cheetahs, caracals, lions and spotted hyenas are also living in the national park. The park supports large bird populations. Though a major wildlife preserve, the park lies within a Total oil concession, potentially exposing it to surveying and drilling.

On 6 July 2011, three days before South Sudan formally seceded from Sudan, an administrative headquarters was officially opened at a ribbon-cutting ceremony led by Central Equatoria Governor Clement Wani and USAID's Sudan director William Hammink. Due to South Sudan's intense poverty and a lack of facilities, something the new administrative center is part of plans to alleviate, Bandingilo is one of the least touristed national parks in the world.

See also
List of national parks in Africa

References

National parks of South Sudan
Central Equatoria
Eastern Equatoria
Equatoria
Protected areas established in 1992
Important Bird Areas of South Sudan